Tenthredo scrophulariae, the figwort sawfly is a species of the family Tenthredinidae, subfamily Tenthredininae.

Distribution and habitat

This species is widespread across Europe, Turkey and Transcaucasia, in meadows wherever Figwort grows.

Description
It is easily recognisable by its wasplike appearance although lacking the thin 'waist' of a true wasp. The head is black and quite short, with prominent, rectangular back corners. The flagellum of the antennae is not narrowed on the tip, it is quite short (less than twice as long as the head width) compared to many related species. It is orange colored, while in most similar species of the genus it is black. The thorax is predominantly black, only the pronotum and scutellum are yellow. The abdomen is black, with transverse bands of yellow.

The leading edge of the forewings, including the veins, is intense orange-red colored, while the remaining wing-membrane is transparent pale yellowish, gray tinted towards the tip. The front legs are almost completely yellow, but  the upper sides of the femurs are black. The middle and the rear legs are orange, but the femurs of the rear legs completely black. In the middle leg pair, the femurs may be completely black or with only black  rear sides.

The rather large larvae may reach a length of about 30 millimeters.  They have a dark head, with a dusty greyish-white and black-spotted body.

Biology
The larvae feed from August to September. They hibernate on October. The adults are on the wing from May to August of the following year. These sawflies are quite placid and allow close observation. They fly in a lazy style with their long yellow legs hanging down. The adults feed on small insects and can be  often found on umbellifers (Heracleum sphondylium), feeding on nectar and pollen. The larvae feed primarily on leaves of Figwort, (Scrophularia).

They also occur on Buddleja and on black mullein (Verbascum nigrum), where they feed only on the less hairy, older leaves.

The larvae are parasitized by various parasitoid species of Ichneumonidae (Mesoleptidea prosoleuca and Euceros serricornis).

Gallery

References 

 R.R. Benson: Hymenoptera 2. Symphyta, Section b. Handbook for the identification of British insects Vol. VI Part 2b. Published by the Royal Entomological Society of London. 1952

External links

 LES TENTHREDES at Aramel.free 

Sawflies described in 1758
Taxa named by Carl Linnaeus
Insect pests of ornamental plants
Tenthredinidae